Henry Edward Allison (born April 25, 1937) is a scholar of Immanuel Kant, widely considered to be one of the most eminent English-language Kant scholars of the postwar era. He is Emeritus Professor at the University of California, San Diego and Boston University.

Education and career

Allison earned his Ph.D. in philosophy at the New School for Social Research in 1964 with a dissertation on Lessing written under the direction of Aron Gurwitsch.  He taught from 1973 until 1997 at the University of California, San Diego, where an endowed chair was named in his honor.  He joined the faculty at Boston University in 1997. He is a fellow of the Norwegian Academy of Science and Letters from 1996.

Philosophical work

His interests are Immanuel Kant, Baruch Spinoza, German idealism, 18th and 19th century philosophy. Allison is perhaps best known for his 1983 book, Kant's Transcendental Idealism, which proposed a new "epistemological" reading of the Critique of Pure Reason that was both radically different from standard interpretations and offered responses to many of the objections advanced by philosophers like Paul Guyer.  The "two aspects' reading "interprets transcendental idealism as a fundamentally epistemological theory that distinguishes between two standpoints on the objects of experience: the human standpoint, from which objects are viewed relative to epistemic conditions that are peculiar to human cognitive faculties (namely, the a priori forms of our sensible intuition); and the standpoint of an intuitive intellect, from which the same objects could be known in themselves and independently of any epistemic conditions."

See also 

 Immanuel Kant
 Transcendental idealism

References 

1937 births
Living people
American philosophers
Kant scholars
Members of the Norwegian Academy of Science and Letters